Todaro is a surname. Notable people with the surname include:

 Agostino Todaro (1818–1892), Italian botanist
 Francesco Todaro (1839–1918), Italian anatomist
 Frank Todaro (1889–1944), American mobster
 Joseph Todaro Jr. (born 1945/46), American mobster
 Joseph Todaro Sr. (1923–2012), American mobster
 Julie Todaro, American librarian
 Michael Todaro (born 1942), American economist
 Rosalba Todaro, Chilean economist
 Salvatore Todaro (mobster) (1885–1929), American mobster

Italian-language surnames